Palasa-Kasibugga Municipality is the local self government in Palasa and Kasibugga of the Indian state of Andhra Pradesh. It is classified as a 2nd Grade Municipality. It constitutes total population of 57,507.

Area
Palasa-Kasibugga Municipality has an area of 32.75 Sq. Km. It is the largest Municipality in terms of area in the district.

Administration

Palasa-Kasibugga municipality was formed in the year 2000. The municipality is spread  over an area of 37.75 and has 31 election wards. each represented by a ward member and the wards committee is headed by a chairperson. The present municipal commissioner of the city is Sri Viswanadham.

Municipal Chairman
 Vajja Baburao (2002-2007)
 Kotni Lakshmi (2007-2012)
 Kotha Purna Chandra Rao (2014–19)
 Balla Giribabu (2021-  )

See also
 List of municipalities in Andhra Pradesh

References

2000 establishments in Andhra Pradesh
Government agencies established in 2000
Municipal Councils in Andhra Pradesh